, also called Two Car: Racing Sidecar, is a Japanese anime television series about motorcycle sidecar racing, created by Silver Link as their 10th anniversary project. It aired from October 7 to December 23, 2017.

Plot
The story follows Yuri Miyata and Megumi Meguro, a pair of sidecar racing team members living on Miyake Island, where they take on other rival motorcycle sidecar teams.

Characters

Betty and Tina Birchall 

Siblings from the Isle of Man's racing circuit.

Media

Manga 
A spin-off manga titled Two Car Everyday, written by dōjinshi artist Eromane, was serialized in Media Factory's Monthly Comic Alive from September 9, 2017, to January 27, 2018.  A main manga adaptation was serialized in Kadokawa's ComicWalker website from October 2017 to May 2018.

Two Car Everyday

Two Car

Anime 
Nikoichi was credited for the original work. Masafumi Tamura directed the anime at Silver Link. Katsuhiko Takayama supervised and wrote the series scripts. Tiv drafted the original character design concepts, and Yuki Sawairi adapted those designs for animation. Sphere performed the opening theme "Heart to Heart", while Void_Chords performed the ending theme "Angelica Wind" alongside Aoi Koga & Aimi Tanaka. Crunchyroll streamed the anime.

Reception

Previews
Anime News Network had four editors review the first episode of the anime: Rebecca Silverman gave praise to the episode for its luscious backgrounds and building interest in the sport of sidecar racing; Theron Martin saw intrigue in the Yuri and Megumi relationship possibly making for an interesting watch but was unsure of its place in the fall season schedule; James Beckett praised the animation of the racing sequences and the added use of CG to them, but was critical of the two main leads being characterized and motivated over a romance with their unseen coach. The fourth reviewer, Nick Creamer, felt the show lacked a "real sense of drama or urgency" in both its racing scenes and character interactions, concluding that it "isn't a terrible show in any way, it also doesn't present any convincing reasons to keep watching. This one's an easy skip."

Series reception
Stig Høgset, writing for THEM Anime Reviews, praised the sidecar racing scenes for having beautiful scenery that complement the CG vehicles during the high-octane moments, the sound editing to accentuate driving the courses and the sidecar technical aspects but was critical of the cast of racing teams acting as bearers for the series' unfulfilling comedic and dramatic story elements, concluding with, "Come for the bikes, because the drama and the comedy is definitely not up to speed."

See also

 Isle of Man Sidecar TT racing

References

External links
Official website 

2017 anime television series debuts
Anime with original screenplays
AT-X (TV network) original programming
Crunchyroll anime
Kadokawa Dwango franchises
Media Factory manga
Animated television series about auto racing
Motorsports in anime and manga
Seinen manga
Silver Link